Michael LeBoeuf is an American business author and former management professor at the University of New Orleans.

Biography 

His eight books have been published in over a dozen different languages, serialized in magazines and newspapers worldwide and adapted to produce 16 different audio and video cassette programs. LeBoeuf is also a consultant, and frequently speaks to businesses of all sizes ranging from Fortune 500 companies to small banks and medical practices.

LeBoeuf is a Professor Emeritus at the University of New Orleans, where he taught for 20 years before retiring in 1989.

Bibliography 

Working Smart
Imagineering
The Productivity Challenge: How to Make It Work for America and You (1982)
GMP: The Greatest Management Principle in the World
The Millionaire in You
The Perfect Business
How to Win Customers and Keep them for Life

References 

American non-fiction writers
Living people
Year of birth missing (living people)